The 2002 Ball State Cardinals football team represented Ball State University during the 2002 NCAA Division I-A football season. The Cardinals were led by eighth-year head coach Bill Lynch. The Cardinals played their home games at Ball State Stadium as members of the West Division of the Mid-American Conference (MAC). They finished the season 6–6, 4–4 in MAC play to finish in third place in the West Division. After the season, Lynch was fired as the Cardinals' head coach. Despite finishing the season with a 6-6 record, the Cardinals did not participate in a bowl game.

Schedule

Roster

References

Ball State
Ball State Cardinals football seasons
Ball State Cardinals football